Olga Aleksandrovna Ladyzhenskaya (7 March 1922 – 12 January 2004) was a  Russian  mathematician who worked on partial differential equations, fluid dynamics, and the finite difference method for the Navier–Stokes equations. She received the Lomonosov Gold Medal in 2002. She is the author of more than two hundred scientific works, among which are six monographs.

Biography 
Ladyzhenskaya was born and grew up in the small town of Kologriv, the daughter of a mathematics teacher who is credited with her early inspiration and love of mathematics. The artist Gennady Ladyzhensky was her grandfather's brother, also born in this town. In 1937 her father, Aleksandr Ivanovich Ladýzhenski, was arrested by the NKVD and executed as an "enemy of the people".

Ladyzhenskaya completed high school in 1939, unlike her older sisters who weren't permitted to do the same. She was not admitted to the Leningrad State University due to her father's status and  attended a pedagogical institute. After the German invasion of June 1941, she taught school in Kologriv. She was eventually admitted to Moscow State University in 1943 and graduated in 1947.

She began teaching in the Physics department of the university in 1950 and defended her PhD there, in 1951, under Sergei Sobolev and Vladimir Smirnov. She received a second doctorate from the Moscow State University in 1953. In 1954, she joined the mathematical physics laboratory of the Steklov Institute and became its head in 1961.

Ladyzhenskaya had a love of arts and storytelling, counting writer Aleksandr Solzhenitsyn and poet Anna Akhmatova among her friends. Like Solzhenitsyn she was religious. She was once a member of the city council, and engaged in philanthropic activities, repeatedly risking her personal safety and career to aid people opposed to the Soviet regime. Ladyzhenskaya suffered from various eye problems in her later years and relied on special pencils to do her work. 

Two days before a trip to Florida, she died in her sleep in Russia on 12 January 2004.

Mathematical accomplishments
Ladyzhenskaya is known for her work on partial differential equations (especially Hilbert's nineteenth problem) and fluid dynamics. She provided the first rigorous proofs of the convergence of a finite difference method for the Navier–Stokes equations.

She analyzed the regularity of parabolic equations, with Vsevolod A. Solonnikov and her student Nina Ural’tseva, and the regularity of quasilinear elliptic equations.

She wrote a student thesis under Ivan Petrovsky and was on the shortlist for the 1958 Fields Medal, ultimately awarded to Klaus Roth and René Thom.

Publications 
 .
 .
 .
  (Translated by Jack Lohwater).

Awards and recognitions
 P. L. Chebyshev Prize (with Nina Nikolayevna Ural'tseva ) (1966) for the work "Linear and quasilinear equations of elliptic type”
 USSR State Prize (1969)
 Member of Lincei National Academy in Rome (1989)
 Member of the Russian Academy of Sciences (1990)
 Kovalevskaya Prize (1992) for the series of works "Attractors for Semigroups and Evolution Equations"
 ICM Emmy Noether Lecture (1994)
 John von Neumann Lecture (1998)
 Order of Friendship (1999)
 Lomonosov Gold Medal (2002) for outstanding achievements in the field of the theory of partial differential equations and mathematical physics
 On 7 March 2019, the 97th anniversary of Ladyzhenskaya's birth, the search engine Google released a Google Doodle commemorating her. The accompanying comment read, "Today's Doodle celebrates Olga Ladyzhenskaya, a Russian mathematician who triumphed over personal tragedy and obstacles to become one of the most influential thinkers of her generation."
 In 2022, the "Ladyzhenskaya Prize in Mathematical Physics" is created in her honor. It has been awarded for the first time on July 2, 2022 to Svetlana Jitomirskaya in a joint session at (WM)², World Meeting for Women in Mathematics and at the Probability and Mathematical Physics conference OAL Prize Winner 2022.

Notes

See also
Projection method (fluid dynamics)

References
 
 . Some recollections of the authors about Olga Ladyzhenskaya and Olga Oleinik.
 .
 
 
 . A biography in the Biographies of Women Mathematicians, Agnes Scott College.
 .
 . Some recollections of the author about Olga Ladyzhenskaya and Olga Oleinik.
 
 
  []

External links

 . The schedule of a workshop in honour of Olga A. Ladyzhenskaya.
 . The proceedings of a workshop in honour of Olga Ladyzhenskaya and Olga Oleinik.
 .
 .
 
 . Memorial page at the Saint Petersburg Mathematical Pantheon.

1922 births
2004 deaths
People from Kologrivsky District
Writers from Kostroma Oblast
20th-century Russian mathematicians
20th-century women scientists
Mathematical analysts
Full Members of the USSR Academy of Sciences
Full Members of the Russian Academy of Sciences
Fluid dynamicists
PDE theorists
Recipients of the Lomonosov Gold Medal
20th-century women mathematicians
Moscow State University alumni
Saint Petersburg State University alumni
Academic staff of the Steklov Institute of Mathematics
Russian Christians
Soviet mathematicians